Ceratoxanthis rakosyella is a species of moth of the family Tortricidae. It is found in Romania.

The wingspan is 16–17 mm. Adults have been recorded on wing from May to June.

References

Moths described in 2000
Cochylini